The Naval Special Operations Force (Vietnamese: Lực lượng Đặc nhiệm hải quân) also known as Maritime Commando (đặc công nước) is an elite special force of the Vietnam People's Navy trained to attack enemy water targets such as harbors, ships, etc. and targets that can only be accessed via water: Isolated bases, naval bases, etc. Compared to the ground commandos, some view the naval special forces as even more advanced, with the belief that "fighting in the water is much more difficult than on land", and the equipment and weapons are also different than their land variant. This is the most elite special forces of the Vietnam People's Navy.

History 
During the First Indochina War, the river operations of the French army accounted for an important part of the battlefield. Taking advantage of Vietnam's territory with a long coastline, many rivers, and interlaced rivers like the Southwest region, the French army deployed a rather strong navy. The French Navy focuses on three main activities:

 Use combat ships to support infantry to sweep.
 Raiding the base, preventing the Viet Minh's supplies and transportation.
 Using waterways to provide supplies to the French on land.

To counter the activities of the French Navy, the armed forces of the Viet Minh built French ship hunting squads, including naval special forces, in the riparian and coastal areas, ready to against the French on the river front.

During the Battle of the Day River (June 1951), a task group led by Nguyễn Quang Vinh (of 36th Regiment, 308th Battalion) used bamboo boats with 300 kg of explosives to sink LCD ships carrying weapons of French army. This is the opening battle for how to fight warships on the Northern battlefield, creating a premise for the use of special forces to hit targets named rivers and seas. In the South, in early 1949, the Long Châu Sa ship hunting team used homemade mines to sink the Glycin ship on the Sài Thượng River, killing hundreds of enemy troops.

In the Rừng Sác area, in September 1950, special teams were formed from the 300th Regiment, operating in the areas of Nhà Bè, Thủ Thiêm down to Cần Giờ, Soài Rạp. This force fought very bravely, daringly, known as "suicide troops", killing many French commanders and henchmen. Thus, in the early stages of the resistance war, along with the fighting style of the special forces, the fighting style of the Naval Special Force also began to develop. Based on the progress of weapons research and improvement, localities in the North and the South have organized a specialized force to hit ships and boats by special operations.

Organisation 
Naval Special Forces, formerly Đoàn 820, or 2nd division, based in Haiphong.

Nowadays, there is only 1 unit is 126th Naval Special Forces Brigade consists of 1st, 2nd, 3rd, 4th battalion; Counter-Tertorist company; Frogman company and a boat squadron.

Current equipment 
Infantry weapons:

Supported military motor vehicles:

Gallery

References

External links 
 Water commandos
 Elite as a naval commando.
 The 'frogman' in the M26 Naval Special Force Squadron
 The power of the Vietnamese frogman commando
 5th Commando Brigade: Intensive, Advanced Mission-Based Training
 Vietnamese naval commando appeared for the first time
 Snorkeling with a special frogman
 Naval Special Forces: The "iron men" protect the sea and islands of the Fatherland.

Vietnam People's Navy
Special forces of Vietnam